Maryvale is a small community in the Canadian province of Nova Scotia, located in Antigonish County. The name is derived from the local church, St. Mary's Parish and Vale, as in valley.

Geography of Nova Scotia